Jacques Brodeur is a Canadian biologist, currently a Canada Research Chair in Biocontrol at Université de Montréal.

References

Year of birth missing (living people)
Living people
Academic staff of the Université de Montréal
Canadian biologists
Academic staff of Université Laval
Université Laval alumni